Harry Zell Thomason (born November 30, 1940) is an American film and television producer and director, best known for the television series Designing Women. Thomason and his wife, Linda Bloodworth-Thomason, are close friends of President Bill Clinton and U.S. Secretary of State Hillary Clinton, and played a major role in President Clinton's election campaigns.

Biography 
Harry Z. Thomason was born in Hampton, Arkansas, the son of a Southern Baptist deacon. He was a Little Rock, Arkansas, high school science teacher and football coach. He married and divorced Judy Crump, with whom he has a daughter, Stacy.

In 1983, Thomason and his second wife, Linda Bloodworth-Thomason, were married and formed Mozark Productions, the vehicle for several successful television series, including Designing Women, Hearts Afire, and Evening Shade. In 2007, they began production on the HBO series 12 Miles of Bad Road, starring Lily Tomlin.

Thomason was a close friend of Bill Clinton and produced the glowing biographical film, The Man from Hope, the centerpiece of the 1992 Democratic National Convention. Thomason and his partner, Darnell Martens, provided charter air service for the Clinton campaign and served as an image consultant. After Clinton was elected, Thomason became embroiled in the Travelgate scandal. His partner, Martens, reported that he had heard rumors that the White House Travel Office was corrupt and disloyal to the Clintons. This view of the Travel Office was compounded by a series of leaks at the White House that were unfavorable to the Clintons. Thomason began pressing Hillary Clinton to investigate the travel office. When the financial irregularities were discovered, the White House called in the FBI. The resulting firings generated a great deal of negative press coverage and an investigation of the events surrounding it, including Thomason and Martens' air service. Thomason served as co-chairman of the 1992 Presidential Inauguration Committee and once again worked as an image consultant at the beginning of the Lewinsky scandal. Thomason ended up testifying before the Lewinsky Grand Jury.

In 2004, Thomason produced the film documentary version of The Hunting of the President from the book by Joe Conason and Gene Lyons, about political efforts to discredit and defeat Bill and Hillary Clinton. With Nickolas Perry, Thomason was nominated for the Writers Guild of America Award for Best Documentary Screenplay for the film.

Television credits 
Designing Women – director and executive producer
Emeril – director and executive producer
Evening Shade – director
Hearts Afire – Writer, director, executive producer
Lime Street – executive producer
The Blue and the Gray – producer
The Fall Guy – Writer
Women of the House – director, producer, executive producer

Motion picture credits 
A Shining Season – producer
Encounter with the Unknown – writer, director
Revenge of Bigfoot – director, producer
So Sad About Gloria – director, producer
The Day it Came to Earth – director, executive producer
The Designing Women Reunion – director
The Great Lester Boggs – director
The Man from Hope – director
To Find My Son – producer
The Hunting of the President – producer
The Last Ride – director, producer

Quotes 
"When you're in the political realm, you become a public figure, and anything is fair."

Adapted from the article Harry Thomason, from Wikinfo, licensed under the GNU Free Documentation License.

References

External links 
Mozark Productions Official Site

1940 births
Living people
American film producers
American television producers
People from Hampton, Arkansas
Whitewater controversy
Designing Women